Jimmy Marlu (born 25 May 1977) is a retired French rugby player.

His usual positions was Fullback but he also played Wing. He played for AS Montferrand where he won the European Challenge Cup. He made his debut for France in a match against Fiji in Suva. He was selected for the 1999 Rugby World Cup but he didn't play any test. In 2003 he left Clermont for Biarritz where he won two Top 14.

Honour
ASM Clermont Auvergne
European Challenge Cup (1999)
Coupe de France (2001)
Challenge Yves du Manoir (2001)
Top 14 (1999 and 2001 finalist)
Biarritz Olympique
Heineken Cup (2006 finalist)
Top 14 (2000 and 2006)
France
Grand Slam (2002)

External links
 ESPN player profile

Living people
French rugby union players
Biarritz Olympique players
French people of Martiniquais descent
France international rugby union players
1977 births
Rugby union fullbacks